Cachito de Cielo (English title: Sent from Heaven) is a Mexican telenovela produced by Giselle González and Roberto Gómez Fernández for Televisa. It premiered on Canal de las Estrellas on June 11, 2012. Due to the controversy surrounding the show regarding religion, and low ratings in Mexico, Cachito de Cielo concluded on November 9, 2012.

Maite Perroni and Pedro Fernández star as the protagonists, while Rafael Inclán, Jorge Poza, and Esmeralda Pimentel are antagonists.

In the United States, Univision aired Cachito de Cielo from July 22, 2013 to December 20, 2013.

Plot
Renata Landeros de Franco (Maite Perroni) is a young journalist who is in love with Adrian Gomes "Cachito" (Mane de la Parra). Both of them are happy until Cachito seems to die in a soccer match by getting hit by lightning. The problem is that Cachito was not scheduled to die, but an error of the angels (who misread Gomez for Gomes) results in Cachito's spirit being harvested prematurely. Thus the angels need to send Cachito back to earth to live his earthly life; yet the body of Cachito is no longer usable. Thus Cachito is reincarnated in an available body, that of a priest, Salvador Santillán "Padre Chava" (Pedro Fernández). Cachito resumes his reincarnated life as a new priest of the parish in which his family lived. Cachito-Salvador must pursue Renata, since he is in love with her, though he has been forbidden by the angels to do so. Thus a conflict ensues between Cachito-Salvador and the meddling angels.

Cast 

{| class="wikitable"
|- bgcolor="#CCCCCC"
! Actor || Character 
|-
| Pedro Fernández || Padre Salvador Santillán / Adrián Gómez Obregón "Cachito"
|-
| Maite Perroni || Renata Landeros De Franco
|-
| Cynthia Klitbo || Adela Silva de Salazar "Pachi"
|- 
| Jorge Poza || Fabio Montenegro
|-
| Azela Robinson || Teresa De Franco de Landeros "Teté"
|-
| Cecilia Gabriela || Isabel Obregón Vda. de Gómez
|-
| César Bono || Lucas 
|-
| Juan Carlos Barreto || Tristán Luna
|-
| Raquel Pankoswky || Coca Obregon 
|-
| Adalberto Parra || Reynaldo Salazar 
|-
| Eduardo España || Ariel 
|-
| Juan Carlos Colombo || Ezequiel
|-
| Otto Sirgo || Gustavo Mendiola
|-
| Esmeralda Pimentel || Mara Magaña 
|-
| Pablo Lyle || Matías Salazar Silva / Matías Landeros Silva 
|-
| Sofía Castro || Sofía Salvatierra
|-
| Anahí Allué || María del Pilar "Pili"
|-
| Ariane Pellicer || Orfe
|-
| José Ángel Bichir || Guillermo "Memo"
|-
| Alfredo Gatica || Darío Fernández
|-
| Elizabeth Valdez || Diana Gomes Obregon 
|-
| Claudio Rocca || Alfonso "Poncho" Núñez|-
| Adriana Goss || Gabriela "Gaby"
|-
| Gema Cuevas || Gema 
|-
| Rafael Inclán || Ernesto Landeros "Pupi"
|-
|}

Special participation

 Production 
Production of Cachito de Cielo'' officially started on April 10, 2012.

Awards and nominations

References 

Mexican telenovelas
Televisa telenovelas
2012 telenovelas
2012 Mexican television series debuts
Spanish-language telenovelas
2012 Mexican television series endings